Fida Muhammad Nashad is a senior Pakistani politician from Gilgit Baltistan who served as the 2nd speaker of the Gilgit Baltistan Assembly. He was a member of the Pakistan Muslim League N. He joined Pakistan Tehreek-e-Insaf. He is the chairman of Baltistan Culture and Development Foundation (BCDF).

Early life and education 

Fida Muhammad Nashad belongs to The  Royal family of Baltistan "The Maqpoons". He was born in a village in Skardu called Hussain Abad to Mr Kacho Amir Baig Maqpon, who had contributed a lot for the freedom of Baltistan from Dogra raaj during the 1940s. Fida Muhammad Nashad started his early education from his own hometown Hussain Abad (then called khiphchong).

Political career 
Fida Muhammad Nashad was an active member of PML (N) from district Skardu. He is the member of MDGs task force from the Legislative Assembly of Gilgit Baltistan. Previously he was elected as a member of Northern Areas Council in 1994. He was elected for the 2nd term in 1999 as member of Northern Areas Council. He was later elected as (Chief Minister) Deputy Chief Executive of the council. He was elected for the 3rd term in 2004 as member of NAs council.

Fida Muhammad Nashad won his seat in GBLA-9 in the 2015 Gilgit Baltistan elections. He then was elected as the speaker of Gilgit Baltistan Assembly.

In 2020, before 2020 Gilgit Baltistan elections, He joined Pakistan Tehreek-e-Insaf.

Book 
Fida Muhammad Nashad made a book Slachen which he presented to Pakistan's former president Mamnoon Hussain. he has four books .namely siachen a collection of articles on siachen glaciar , one travelogue book to iran and iraq and a poetry book.

Elections 2020 
Fida Muhammad Nashad was candidate from GBA-9 as a ticket holder of PTI however he was defeated by Wazir Muhammad Saleem and independent Candidate.

Poetry 
Fida Muhammad Nashad is a well known poet of Gilgit Baltistan. He usually writes qasida, manqabat and hamdia but also has an interest in ghazaliat. His first poetry collection is in publication now.

References

Living people
Year of birth missing (living people)
People from Skardu District
Gilgit-Baltistan MLAs 2015–2020
Pakistan Muslim League (N) politicians